Naomichi Donoue (堂上 直倫, born September 23, 1988 in Japan) is a Japanese professional baseball player for the Chunichi Dragons in Japan's Nippon Professional Baseball. He is a utility infielder and has played at various positions including short stop, third base and second base.

Career
Donoue was the first draft pick for the Dragons at the 2006 NPB Draft, the same draft class as teammates Takuya Asao and Nobumasa Fukuda.

While mainly used as a utility infielder for the majority of his career, Donoue became the every day starting shortstop for the Dragons in the  season showing great defensive abilities as well as handy form with the bat.

On 28 August 2016, Donoue hit his first career grand slam at the Nagoya Dome against the would-be Central League champion Hiroshima Carp in a 7-5 victory.

Personal
His father Terashi is a former pro having pitched for the Chunichi Dragons between 1971 and 1985. His elder brother Takehiro is former professional baseball player who played for both the Dragons and the Yomiuri Giants.

References

External links

NPB.jp

1988 births
Living people
Chunichi Dragons players
Japanese baseball players
Nippon Professional Baseball second basemen
Nippon Professional Baseball shortstops
Nippon Professional Baseball third basemen
People from Kasugai, Aichi
Baseball people from Aichi Prefecture